Les Harrison may refer to:

 Les Harrison (basketball) (1904–1997), American basketball player, coach and team owner
 Les Harrison (footballer) (born 1945), Australian rules footballer